Keith Norman Schoville is an American, born on March 3, 1928, at soldiers Grove, Wisconsin, United States.He is a Christian. He was the son of Harley Leonard and Viva Ruth (Banta) Schoville. He is a professor emeritus at the University of Wisconsin–Madison, he specializes in ancient languages. Keith Norman Schoville got his Bachelor in Art at milligan college, Johnson City, Tennessee, in 1956 and also is Masters in Art at the University of Wisconsin, in 1966 and his doctorate in philosophy at the University of Wisconsin, in 1969.

Education  
Schoville received his BA from Milligan College in 1956, his MA from the University of Wisconsin in 1966, and his PhD from the University of Wisconsin in 1969.

Academic career
He was instructor of Hebrew and Semitic studies at UW-Madison from 1968 to 1970, and was then promoted to professor of Hebrew and Semitic studies, a position he held from 1970 to 1995; he also  and served as the chairman of the department. He was the president of the Near East Archaeological Society, and  vice-president of the American Oriental Society's Midwest Section. He was theeditor for Hebrew Studies Volumes 24 and 25.

His work investigated the origins of writing and the alphabet and served as project director for an exhibition named Sign, Symbol and Script: An Exhibition on the Origins of Writing which was exhibited at eight locations in the United States. accompanied by  a series of 21 public lectures. He was a co-host of the radio program Book and the Spade for 30 years. In the 1980s, he was one of the University of Wisconsin faculty  who presented public lectures in the Great Hall of the Memorial Union  on various academic topics from a Christian perspective. These lectures were incorporated into the book Christianity Challenges the University.

In 2000, he won the Distinguished Alumni Award from Milligan College.

Works

Books
 Beyond the Jordan: Studies in Honor of W. Harold Mare, 2005. Wipf & Stock Pub.  
 Reports of the Expedition to the Dead Sea Plain, Jordan, vol. 1, Bab edh-Dhra: Excavation in the Century Directed by Paul W. Lapp, 1965–67. The Journal of the American Oriental Society, 2005, volume 1   
 The College Press NIV Commentary Ezra-Nehemiah, 2001. College Press Publishing Company, Inc  
 Genesis to Revelation - Exodus and Leviticus Student Book, 1997. Abingdon Press. 
 Genesis to Revelation - Hebrews, James, 1 and 2 Peter, 1, 2, 3, John and Jude Student Book, 1997. Abingdon Press. 
 Basic Bible Commentary Exodus and Leviticus Volume 2, 1994. Abingdon Press.     
 Hebrews; James; 1 and 2 Peter; 1, 2, and 3; Jude, 1986. Graded Press.  * Sign, Symbol, Script. An Exhibition on the Origins of Writing and the Alphabet, 1984.  Department of Hebrew and Semitic Studies, University of Wisconsin, Madison 
 Biblical Archaeology in Focus, 1978.  Baker Book House. . According to WorldCat, the book is in 335 libraries.    Reviews of this book include, and

Other publications
 Menahem Mansoor: Scholar, Teacher, Mentor, 1982. Hebrew Studies 1982. volume 23. pages 3–15 
 Digging Dan - 1976 Season, 1977.Hebrew Studies volume 18, pages 170-174 
 Root-Determinatives in Hebrew, Hurwitz Revisited, 1974. Hebrew Abstracts  volume 15, pages 47–49

Notes and references 

1928 births
Living people
Milligan University alumni
University of Wisconsin–Madison alumni
University of Wisconsin–Madison faculty
Writers from Wisconsin
Bible commentators